Vennli is a privately held Indiana based company focused on driving the creation and execution of growth strategies. The company’s SaaS product suite centers on building growth cases – strategic and tactical plans for growth in specific market segments defined by customer segment and competitor options. The Vennli strategy model has been implemented and executed at hundreds of organizations across a variety of dynamic markets around the world.

History
Vennli was founded in 2013 upon a strategy model developed by co-founder Joe Urbany, a marketing professor from the University of Notre Dame, and co-founder Gary Gigot, whose background includes technology marketing and venture capital at firms such as Microsoft, Visio, and Frazier Technology. Vennli launched the platform in 2014 with a fully functional application. In the summer of 2014, Vennli conducted a beta introduction with over 80 customers – spanning company size, industry, and type. Currently, over 100 clients have applied the platform to their growth challenges (this is in addition to the 800+ Notre Dame Executive MBA students who have applied the model to business challenges over the past decade).

References

2013 establishments in Indiana